(in Spanish),  (in Aragonese), or  (in Catalan), is a municipality located in the province of Huesca, Aragon, Spain. According to the 2004 census (INE), the municipality has a population of 146 inhabitants.

References

Municipalities in the Province of Huesca